Rahul Sharma may refer to:
Rahul Sharma (actor), Indian actor
Rahul Sharma (Gujarat police), Indian police officer
Rahul Sharma (Hong Kong cricketer) (born 1960), Hong Kong cricketer
Rahul Sharma (cricketer, born 1986), Indian cricketer
Rahul Sharma (cricketer, born 1996), Indian cricketer
Rahul Sharma (musician) (born 1972), Indian musician